The Miss Michigan World competition is a beauty pageant that selects the representative for Michigan in the Miss World America pageant.

The current Miss Michigan World is Emily Tomchin of Ann Arbor.

Winners 
Color key

Notes to table

References

External links

Michigan culture
Women in Michigan